Jack the Ripper is a 1976 German thriller film directed by Jesús Franco and starring Klaus Kinski. In this Swiss-German film Klaus Kinski portrays Jack the Ripper.

Cast
 Klaus Kinski as Dr. Dennis Orloff / Jack the Ripper
 Josephine Chaplin as Cynthia
 Andreas Mannkopff as Inspektor Selby
 Herbert Fux as Charlie, the Fisherman
 Lina Romay as Marika Stevenson
 Nikola Weisse as Frieda
 Ursula von Wiese as Miss Higgins (as Ursula v. Wiese)
 Hans Gaugler as Mr. Bridger, the blind man
 Francine Custer as Sally Brown, first victim
 Olga Gebhard as Ms. Baxter
 Angelika Arndts as Ms. Stevenson
 Peter Nüsch as Sergeant Ruppert (as Peter Nuesch)
 Esther Studer as Jeanny, second victim
 Regine Elsener as Blondy
 Lorli Bucher as Lulu
 Mike Lederer as Coach Driver
 Otto Dornbierer as Charlie's friend

References

External links

1976 films
1976 horror films
1970s horror thriller films
1970s historical horror films
1970s German-language films
Swiss historical horror films
Swiss horror thriller films
German horror thriller films
German historical horror films
West German films
Films directed by Jesús Franco
Films set in 1888
Films set in London
Films about Jack the Ripper
German serial killer films
1970s German films